The Wigtown Book Festival is a ten-day literary festival held each autumn in Wigtown, Dumfries and Galloway, south-west Scotland. The festival was first held in 1999 and has grown to be the second biggest book festival in Scotland.

In 2007 the Wigtown Festival Company became a registered charity.

In 2013, there were 7500 visitors to the festival, more than half of which were from outside Dumfries and Galloway. A report commissioned by the Wigtown Festival Company in 2013 estimated that the festival contributed £2 million to the regional economy each year. This was three times higher than that estimated by a similar study in 2008.

Future Festival

In 2023, the festival is scheduled 22 September through 1 October 2023.

Poetry competition 
The festival runs an annual poetry competition and awards three separate prizes for compositions in English, Scottish Gaelic and Scots.

References

External links 
 Official website
 Programmes: 2004 2005 2006 2007 20112012 2013 2014 2015 2016 2017 2018 2019

Literary festivals in Scotland
Wigtown
Arts organisations based in Scotland